×  Hawkinsara, abbreviated Hknsa. in  the horticultural trade, is an intergeneric hybrid of orchids, with parent genera Broughtonia, Cattleya, Laelia and Sophronitis.

References

Orchid nothogenera
Laeliinae
Historically recognized angiosperm taxa